Den Junlaphan (born December 4, 1978), better known as Eagle Kyowa, is a Thai former professional boxer who competed from 2000 to 2007. He held the WBC strawweight title twice between 2004 and 2007.

Biography 
Eagle Den Janlaphan was born as the eight of nine children in Phichit, Thailand. He entered Thammasat University at the age of 16, and began boxing, making his amateur debut in 1995. He turned pro, and made his professional debut in January, 2000, in Bangkok, Thailand. He transferred to the Kadoebi Houseki Gym in Tokyo, Japan, and made his Japanese debut in August, 2001 as "Eagle Okuda", winning by first-round knockout. He won the WBC Minimumweight title in January, 2004, beating Jose Antonio Aguirre by decision. He made his first defense in May of the same year, but lost his second defense in December, 2004 against Isaac Bustos. The fight was stopped in the 4th round due to a shoulder injury by Kyowa. He made his return in August, 2005, against Katsunari Takayama, who had beaten Bustos to win the WBC Minimumweight title. Kyowa won by decision, regaining his title.

On January 9, 2006, he defeated Ken Nakajima (14-2-0) by 7th round tko. On May 6, 2006, he defeated future light flyweight champion Rodel Mayol (22-0) by a 12-round unanimous decision. In his next bout, he almost lost his title to journeyman Lorenzo Trejo in November, 2006. Kyowa dropped Trejo in the 3rd round, but was knocked down twice in the 6th. All three judges awarded Kyowa the decision by one point, and Kyowa won a close third title defense (fourth total).

He met Akira Yaegashi, the WBC's 6th ranked contender, on June 4, 2007, in Yokohama, Japan, for his fourth defense (fifth total). Kyowa dominated the young challenger from the first round to make his fourth straight defense by unanimous decision. He lost a point for an accidental head-butt in the 2nd round, but knocked down Yaegashi in the 10th round to secure his victory. All three judges awarded him the win by over ten points. This fight also utilized the open scoring approved by the World Boxing Council. Every four rounds, they would announce the official scoring of the fight. The Japan Boxing Commission is one of the few organizations that has used the WBC's open scoring feature thus far.

On November 29, 2007, Kyowa lost his title to fellow Thai boxer Oleydong Sithsamerchai (24-0-0) by unanimous decision.

See also 
List of WBC world champions
List of Japanese boxing world champions
Boxing in Japan

Notes 
He has a Japanese wife, whom he married in Thailand in 2000. He has two children, born in 2003 and 2004. His wife is a former kickboxer.
He has changed his ring name several times, making his amateur and professional debut with different ring names, and making his Japanese debut as "Eagle Okuda" (イーグル奥田). He changed his ring name to "Eagle Akakura" (イーグル赤倉) after his sponsor in 2003, and finally to "Eagle Kyowa," after the Kyowa buildings company became his sponsor. However, Kyowa went out of business after being investigated over a yakuza connection, forcing Kyowa to change his ring name again to his birth name, Den Janlaphan.
He decided he wanted to become a boxer after seeing legendary Thai fighter Khaosai Galaxy on TV.
During his childhood, he did not have any money to pay for a ferry ride, and swam across a river to get to school.
He has challenged Japanese boxer Koki Kameda several times, but Kameda's management has never acknowledged Kyowa's calls, and it is unlikely that the two will ever fight.

Professional boxing record

External links 

1978 births
Japanese male boxers
Living people
World Boxing Council champions
Mini-flyweight boxers
World mini-flyweight boxing champions
Eagle Kyowa
Eagle Kyowa
Thai expatriate sportspeople in Japan